Trần Thị Tiếc, stagename Ánh Tuyết, (born 1 March 1961 in Hội An) is a Vietnamese singer. She is particularly associated with older pre-Vietnam War songs, and also the 70s songs of Văn Cao and Trịnh Công Sơn.

Albums
 Ca Khúc Văn Cao, Songs of Văn Cao
 Bến cũ
 Hát cho yêu thương  - Phan Bá Chức
 Cung đàn xưa
 Thằng cuội - Tuyệt phẩm Lê Thương
 Thu quyến rũ - Nhạc Đoàn Chuẩn - Từ Linh
 Hội trùng dương 2001
 2005: Đi tìm
 2005: Suối mơ đến Thiên Thai (thu âm trực tiếp)
 Vol 9:  Còn gì cho em  -  Phạm Thế Mỹ
 2010: Bông hồng cái áo, với các ca khúc Phạm Thế Mỹ
 2011 : Ánh Tuyết hát Trịnh Công Sơn CD1 & CD2

References

20th-century Vietnamese women singers
1961 births
Living people
21st-century Vietnamese women